Slabberia is a genus of hydrozoans belonging to the family Corynidae.

The species of this genus are found in Europe, Northern America, Northern Africa, Japan.

Species:

Dipurena dolichogaster 
Dipurena quanzhouensis 
Slabberia halterata 
Slabberia simulans 
Slabberia strangulata

References

Corynidae
Hydrozoan genera